is a Japanese manga artist. She debuted in 2001 with the short story , published in Monthly Gangan Wing. She is best known as the creator of the manga series Arakawa Under the Bridge and Saint Young Men, the latter of which won a Tezuka Osamu Cultural Prize in 2009. A Nikkei Entertainment magazine article  published in August 2011 listed her ninth overall among the top 50 manga creators by sales since 2010, with 5.54 million copies sold. Her artwork has also been featured in two manga exhibitions at the British Museum in London, England. Nakamura gave birth to her first child, a daughter, in November 2011.

Works

 , serialized in Young Gangan (2004–2015)
 , serialized in Monthly Morning Two (2006–present)
 , illustration only, serialized in Weekly Young Jump (2015)
 , serialized in Weekly Young Jump (2016–2019) and Ultra Jump (2019–present)

Awards

|-
! scope="row" | 2008
| Saint Young Men
| Jury Selections
| Japan Media Arts Festival Awards, Manga Division 
| 
| 
| 
|-
! scope="row" | 2009
| Saint Young Men
| Male Readers
| 
| 
| 
| 
|-
! scope="row" | 2009
| Saint Young Men
| 
| Manga Taishō
| 
| 
| 
|-
! scope="row" | 2009
| Saint Young Men
| Short Work Prize
| Tezuka Osamu Cultural Prize
| 
| 
| 
|-
! scope="row" | 2010
| Saint Young Men
| Male Readers
| 
| 
| 
| 
|-
! scope="row" | 2012
| Saint Young Men
| Best Comic
| Angoulême International Comics Festival
| 
| 
| 
|-
! scope="row" | 2015
| Saint Young Men
| Book of the Year
| Da Vinci
| 
| 
|

References

External links

 Official Twitter account 
  (defunct; link via the Wayback Machine) 
 Interview with Jump SQ (defunct; link via the Wayback Machine) 
 Interview with Natsume Ono for Monthly Mornings website 
 

1984 births
Female comics writers
Japanese women writers
Japanese writers
Living people
Manga artists from Shizuoka Prefecture
Women manga artists